Michael Bond is a former Democratic member of the Illinois Senate, representing the 31st District from 2007 to 2011.

He received his Bachelor's degree in Economics from Southern Illinois University in 1992, and his MBA in Finance from Roosevelt University in 1997. Prior to being elected to the Senate he held various finance and budgeting positions with Allstate Insurance Company, most recently Director of Corporate Finance.

Bond was elected to fill the seat being vacated by longtime senator Adeline Jay Geo-Karis. Geo-Karis, who had served in the State Senate since 1979, was defeated in the Republican primary by Sue Simpson. Geo-Karis went on to endorse and actively campaign for Bond. Bond's election, in an historically Republican district, was one of the many Democratic victories in 2006 that gave the Democratic Party a super-majority in the State Senate.

Senator Bond served as the Vice-Chairperson of the Transportation Committee, and serves on Appropriations II, Pensions and Investments, and State Government & Veterans Affairs Committees.

On November 2, 2010, Michael Bond lost the general election to Lake County Board Chairman Suzi Schmidt. He got about 46.5% of the vote, versus just over 53% for Suzi Schmidt.

References

External links
Illinois State Senator Michael Bond official website
Illinois State Senator Michael Bond official campaign website
Illinois General Assembly – Senator Michael Bond (D) 31st District official IL Senate website
Bills Committees
Project Vote Smart – Senator Michael Bond (IL) profile
Follow the Money – Michael Bond
2006 campaign contributions
Illinois State Senate Democrats – Senator Michael Bond profile

Living people
Democratic Party Illinois state senators
People from Grayslake, Illinois
Roosevelt University alumni
Southern Illinois University alumni
Year of birth missing (living people)
21st-century American politicians